The Old Kowloon Fire Station is a former fire station in Tsim Sha Tsui, Kowloon, Hong Kong. Together with the Former Marine Police Headquarters, it is now part of a commercial complex called 1881 Heritage.

The station is located at 33 Salisbury Road, at the corner with Kowloon Park Drive.

The Old Kowloon Fire Station consists of a Main Block and an Accommodation Barrack. The main block was built in 1920, while the two-storey accommodation barrack was completed in 1922. It served as a fire station until 1971, when it was replaced by the Tsim Sha Tsui Fire Station on Canton Road. The fire station was also known as the Terminus Fire Station because of its proximity to the Kowloon station (demolished in 1974), the then south terminus of the British Section of the Kowloon–Canton Railway.

The main block of the fire station has been listed as a Grade II historic building since 2009.

See also
 List of fire stations in Hong Kong

References

External links

 Former Kowloon Fire Station at Gwulo.com:  and 

Buildings and structures completed in 1920
Tsim Sha Tsui
Fire stations in Hong Kong
Grade II historic buildings in Hong Kong
1920 establishments in Hong Kong